Taylor is an unincorporated community in Bienville Parish, Louisiana, United States. Its ZIP code is 71080.

Notes

Unincorporated communities in Bienville Parish, Louisiana
Unincorporated communities in Louisiana